Jean-Antoine Gleizes (1773–1843) was a French writer and advocate of vegetarianism. He was extremely popular and influential at his time. His most famous work is Thalysie: the New Existence (1840, vol. 1; 1841, vol. 2; 1842, vol. 3).

Selected publications

 Thalysie; ou, La nouvelle existence (1841)

References

Reinhold Grimm and Jost Hermand, Re-reading Wagner, University of Wisconsin Press, 1993, pp. 110–113.
 Iacobbo & Iacobbo, Vegetarian America: A History, Praeger, 2004, p. 80.
 Colin Spencer, Vegetarianism: A History, Four Walls Eight Windows, 2002, p. 244.
Howard Williams and Carol J. Adams, The Ethics of Diet: A Catena of Authorities Deprecatory of the Practice of Flesh-Eating, University of Illinois Press, 2003, pp. 208–218.
Jon Wynne-Tyson (comp.), The Extended Circle: A Dictionary of Humane Thought, Centaur Press, London, 2009, pp. 107–109.

External links

Biography and excerpts: Howard Williams, The Ethics of Diet – Gleizes

1773 births
1843 deaths
French male writers
French vegetarianism activists